Kelli Scarr is an American singer and songwriter. She sang vocals on Moby's album Wait for Me, as well as collaborating with him on National Public Radio's "Project Song", resulting in the track "Gone to Sleep".

Scarr also toured with Moby for 15 months in 2009 and 2010. More recently, she has released an individual album called Piece. Audio for the album was made available on the NPR website until its release date, August 10, 2010.

Scarr was nominated for an Emmy Award for her work on the HBO documentary In a Dream.

Early life
Scarr was born in Monterey, California, in the Salinas Valley. At the age of twelve, she relocated with her mother and brother to Folsom, California. Scarr cites music on the radio during drives between her parents' homes in these locations as her early inspiration.

Musical career
Following high school, Scarr was a member of the band Moonraker, first in Boston, then in Brooklyn. After the band's breakup in 2005, she was involved in writing the soundtrack for the HBO documentary In a Dream. She was subsequently nominated for an Emmy Award for the In a Dream score.

In 2009, Scarr met Moby, who asked her to sing vocals for his album Wait for Me. Scarr subsequently toured with Moby for 15 months, both singing with him and opening shows with her own material. Scarr also collaborated with Moby on his appearance on National Public Radio's "Project Song" on May 4, 2010, a challenge for musicians to write a song in no more than 48 hours. Moby and Scarr were able to write the song "Gone to Sleep" in little more than a day, a feat not accomplished by any previous musicians in this challenge. Moby and Scarr had enough time left to record three versions of the song and to perform a short concert for NPR staff.

Scarr's first album, entitled Piece, was released on August 21, 2010. NPR reviewed the album favorably, calling it "enchanting" and noting that the tone of voice created the illusion of the singer being in the room.

In 2016, Scarr performed vocals with J.Viewz in the interactive song "Almost Forgot".

References

Living people
Alternative rock guitarists
American alternative rock musicians
American women guitarists
American women singer-songwriters
American indie rock musicians
People from Folsom, California
Singer-songwriters from California
Year of birth missing (living people)
Guitarists from California
21st-century American women